Arra is a village in Bhatar CD block in Bardhaman Sadar North subdivision of Purba Bardhaman district in the state of West Bengal, India with total 671 families residing.

Transport 

Population 
Most of the villagers are from Schedule Castes (SC), which constitute 38.60% while Schedule Tribes (ST) were 2.62% of the total population in Arra village.

Population and house data

References 

Villages in Purba Bardhaman district